Aubrey FitzClarence, 4th Earl of Munster (7 June 1862 – 1 January 1928) was an English aristocrat and a great-grandson of King William IV by his mistress Dorothea Jordan.

Biography
Aubrey FitzClarence was born in Kensington, London, a son of William FitzClarence, 2nd Earl of Munster (19 May 1824 – 30 April 1901) and Wilhelmina Kennedy-Erskine (27 June 1830 – 9 October 1906). His parents were first cousins, thus making Aubrey a great-grandson of William IV twice over. His paternal grandfather was George FitzClarence, 1st Earl of Munster and his maternal grandmother was Lady Augusta FitzClarence, who were brother and sister.

Aubrey's elder brother, Geoffrey FitzClarence, 3rd Earl of Munster, inherited the Munster earldom and the subsidiary titles of Viscount FitzClarence and Lord Tewkesbury when their father died in 1901. However, Geoffrey was serving in the British Army in South Africa at the time and he died nine months later without ever having returned to England.

Peerage 
When the 3rd Earl died childless in 1902, the earldom and other titles were inherited by Aubrey. Aubrey had held the office of Gentleman Usher-in-Ordinary to Queen Victoria from 1885 to 1901 and to King Edward VII from 23 July 1901 until 7 February 1902, shortly after inheriting the earldom. At that time, Aubrey resigned the office.

Death
Aubrey died unmarried at the age of 65, at which point his nephew, Geoffrey FitzClarence, became the 5th Earl of Munster.

References 

1862 births
1928 deaths
19th-century English people
Gentlemen Ushers
Schuyler family
English people of Dutch descent
4